Cracklings (American English), crackling (British English), also known as scratchings, are the solid material which remains after rendering animal fat and skin to produce lard, tallow, or schmaltz, or as the result of roasting meat. It is often eaten as a snack food or made into animal feed. It is also used in cooking.

Cracklings are most commonly made from pork, goose, and chicken, but are also made from other poultry and from beef, lamb and mutton.

Sources of cracklings

French cuisine
In French cuisine, cracklings (grillons, grattons, gratterons, frittons) may be made from pork, goose, or turkey. These are salted while hot and eaten as an hors-d'œuvre, especially in the southwest.

Pork

Pig skin made into cracklings are a popular ingredient worldwide: in Central European, Quebecois (oreilles de crisse), Latin American and Spanish (chicharrones), East Asian, Southeast Asian, Southern United States, and Cajun (grattons) cuisines. They are often eaten as snacks. In Hungary, they are popular as a breakfast or dinner food.

Beef

Krupuk kulit is an Indonesian cracker (krupuk) made of beef skin.
In Argentina and Uruguay cracklings extracted from tallow are called chicharrones and are a common filling for traditional breads.

Poultry
Goose cracklings are popular in Central European cuisine.

Chicken and goose cracklings are popular in Ashkenazi Jewish cuisine, and are called gribenes.

Lamb and mutton
Cracklings from fat-tailed sheep were until recently a popular ingredient in Persian cuisine:

Uses
Cracklings are used to enrich a wide variety of foods, from soups to desserts. Modern recipes sometimes substitute crumbled cooked bacon.

In German cuisine, cracklings of pork or goose (Grieben) are often added to lard (Schmalz) when it is used as a bread spread.

Crackling is often added to doughs and batters to make crackling bread (French pompe aux grattons), crackling biscuits (Hungarian tepertős pogácsa), or potato pancakes (oladyi).

Salted cracklings are widely used as a snack food.

Cracklings have been used as a supplement to various kinds of animal feed, including for poultry, dogs, and pigs.

Notes

Skin
Meat dishes
Cooking fats
World cuisine